Sérgio Ferreira Sousa (born 11 October 1983) is a Portuguese former cyclist, who rode professionally between 2005 and 2016.

Major results

2006
 9th Overall Volta ao Alentejo
2008
 3rd Overall Vuelta a Extremadura
 8th Overall Troféu Joaquim Agostinho
2009
 4th Overall Troféu Joaquim Agostinho
2010
 2nd Time trial, National Road Championships
 4th Overall Troféu Joaquim Agostinho
2011
 3rd Overall Vuelta a Asturias
 8th Overall Volta a Portugal
 10th Vuelta a La Rioja
2012
 1st  Mountains classification Volta ao Algarve
 2nd Overall GP Liberty Seguros
 3rd Time trial, National Road Championships
2014
 National Road Championships
2nd Road race
3rd Time trial
 2nd Overall GP Liberty Seguros
 8th Overall Troféu Joaquim Agostinho
2015
 6th Overall Volta ao Alentejo
 7th Overall Volta a Portugal
2016
 1st  Overall Flèche du Sud
1st Stage 4

References

External links

1983 births
Living people
Portuguese male cyclists
People from Santo Tirso
Sportspeople from Porto District